Irina Falconi and Petra Martić were the defending champions having won the previous edition in 2015, but chose not to participate.
Riko Sawayanagi and Barbora Štefková won the title, defeating Alison Bai and Varatchaya Wongteanchai in the final, 7–6(8–6), 4–6, [10–7].

Seeds

Draw

References 
 Draw

Burnie International - Doubles
Burnie International